The UND Fighting Hawks women's hockey team represented the University of North Dakota in WCHA women's ice hockey during the 2014-15 NCAA Division I women's ice hockey season.  Despite elimination in the semifinal round of the WCHA Final Face-Off, The Fighting Hawks finished ten wins over .500, and were ranked 8th nationally by both major polling organizations.

Offseason
June 5: Goaltender Shelby Amsley-Benzie earned a spot on the 2013-14 Capital One Academic All-America Women’s At-Large Third Team.

August 5: Gracen Hirschy was the only member of the current North Dakota roster that earned an invitation to the USA Hockey's Women's National Festival in Lake Placid, N.Y.

Recruiting

2014–15 Fighting Hawks

Schedule

|-
!colspan=12 style=""| Regular Season

|-
!colspan=12 style=""| WCHA Tournament

Awards and honors
Shelby Amsley-Benzie, WCHA Outstanding Student-Athlete of the Year 

Shelby Amsley-Benzie, Goaltender, All-WCHA First Team 

Halli Krzyzaniak, Defense, All-WCHA Third Team 

Becca Kohler, Forward, All-WCHA Third Team 

Shelby Amsley-Benzie was the fifth leading goaltender in Goals Against Average in the nation, and the only Goaltender among Patty Kazmaier Award winners.

References

North Dakota
North Dakota Fighting Hawks women's ice hockey seasons
2014 in sports in North Dakota
Fight